The Grand Emporium is a complex with two skyscrapers and a shopping mall in Jinshui District, Zhengzhou, China. The mall was opened on 7 December 2018.

Features

The north tower serves as a service apartment while the south tower (Zhenghong Center) is an office building. The mall is in the podium building.

There is a CGV cinema with an IMAX hall on the L6 level of the mall.

Traffic
The complex is accessible from Dongfenglu station on Zhengzhou Metro Line 2.

References

Shopping malls in Zhengzhou
Commercial buildings completed in 2018
2018 establishments in China